Ja'Tavion Sanders (born March 27, 2003) is an American football tight end for the Texas Longhorns.

Early life and high school
Sanders grew up in Denton, Texas and attended Billy Ryan High School, where he played basketball and was a wide receiver and defensive end on the football team. He was named first team All-District 4-5A Division 1 at defensive end after recording 39 tackles, 20 tackles for loss, 11 sacks, two forced fumbles, and three passes broken up while also catching 47 passes for 763 yards and 7 touchdowns on offense. Sanders had 63 receptions for 1,161 yards and 16 touchdown receptions with three rushing touchdowns while also recording four sacks and an interception on offense and was named the co-MVP of District 5-5A Division 1. Sanders was rated a five-star recruit as an athlete and committed to play college football at Texas over offers from Alabama, Florida, Florida State, Georgia, LSU, Notre Dame, Ohio State, Oklahoma, and Texas A&M.

College career
Sanders joined the Texas Longhorns as an early enrollee in 2021 and played on both offense and defense during preseason practices. The team's coaching staff ultimately decided that he would play tight end. Sanders played in all 12 of the Texas's games during his freshman seasom, primarily on special teams. Sanders entered his sophomore season as the Longhorns' primary tight end after transfer Jahleel Billingsley was suspended for the team's first six games. After his sophomore year, Sanders was named first team All-Big 12.

References

External links
Texas Longhorns bio

Living people
American football tight ends
Texas Longhorns football players
Players of American football from Texas
2003 births